Qermezabad (also Romanized as Qermezābād, Ghermez Abad, Kirmizābād, and Qirmizābād) is a village in Dodangeh-ye Sofla Rural District, Ziaabad District, Takestan County, Qazvin Province, Iran. At the 2006 census, its population was 677, in 158 families.

References 

Populated places in Takestan County